Zamhlai is an urban-type settlement in Chernihiv Raion, Chernihiv Oblast, Ukraine. It belongs to Ripky settlement hromada, one of the hromadas of Ukraine. Population: 

Until 18 July 2020, Zamhlai belonged to Ripky Raion. The raion was abolished in July 2020 as part of the administrative reform of Ukraine, which reduced the number of raions of Chernihiv Oblast to five. The area of Ripky Raion was merged into Chernihiv Raion.

Economy

Transportation
There is infrequent suburban passenger traffic.

Zamhlai is connected to Ripky by a paved road. In Ripky, there is access to Highway M01 which connects Kyiv with the border with Belarus and continues across the border to Gomel.

References

Urban-type settlements in Chernihiv Raion